Rhopalophora serripennis is a species of beetle in the family Cerambycidae. It was described by Giesbert and Chemsak in 1993.

Appearance 
Rhopalophora serripennis is a black beetle with a red prothorax. Its body is long and narrow and between 5-9 mm in length. Males and females appear similar, although only males have white pubescence on their abdomen. R. serripennis may be mistaken for R. punctatipennis and R. miniatocollis, two similar species.

Range 
Rhopalophora serripennis is found in central and southwestern Mexico, as far north as Nayarit and as far south as Chiapas.

References 

serripennis
Beetles described in 1993